Bukit Timah, often abbreviated as Bt Timah, is a planning area and residential estate located in the westernmost part of the Central Region of Singapore.

Owing to its prime location, Bukit Timah has some of the densest clusters of luxury condominiums and landed property in the city, with very few public housing.

Etymology
The first identification of the area was on the 1828 map by Frankin and Jackson and was noted as Bukit Timah. As the interior of Singapore was not fully explored, it is likely the name came from the Malays.

In Malay, Bukit Timah meant Tin bearing hill. The original Malay name was Bukit Temak, meaning "hill of the temak trees" as the temak trees were abundant in the area. It was possible that the British in Singapore had mispronounced or misheard and became Bukit Timah.

History
During Japanese rule, the Japanese built the Syonan Jinja, a Shinto shrine (Syonan-to was the Occupation name for Singapore), similar to the Yasukuni Shrine in Japan but of a smaller size, at Bukit Timah. Two war memorials dedicated to the Japanese war dead and, surprisingly, to the British and Empire troops who died defending Singapore, were built at the site. Students, Japanese commanders and British POWs' representatives would gather there regularly to commemorate the dead during the Occupation. Syonan Jinja was destroyed by the Japanese before the Japanese surrender.

Infrastructure
The Bukit Timah area is a particularly prominent location with high land value.

The Bukit Timah Race Course, a thoroughbred horse racing facility, was opened in 1933 and operated until 1999. The land has since been renovated, and is currently home to The Grandstand, which hosts several food outlets, childcare services and a Giant supermarket.

The nearby area hosts many bungalows, typically expensive in land-scarce Singapore, as well as high rise condominiums. Many expatriates and well-heeled Singaporeans live in this region. Its main attractions include popular eateries at Sixth Avenue, as well as Turf City. 

This region was later extended and Upper Bukit Timah (District 21) was formed.

Mass Rapid Transit 
There are 6 MRT stations within the planning area, spanning 2 lines, the Downtown Line and Circle Line. Stage 2 of the Downtown MRT Line train service started on 27 December 2015 and parallels the Bukit Timah Road. It connects Bukit Panjang in the North-Western edge of Bukit Timah to the city centre in the South. Both lines have an interchange station at Botanic Gardens MRT station. The 6 stations are:

 Beauty World
 King Albert Park
 Sixth Avenue
 Tan Kah Kee
 Farrer Road
 Holland Village

Education 
Bukit Timah is known to having many international schools in the region, due to the high number of expatriates and immigrants living in this region.

Primary schools 
 Bukit Timah Primary School
 Henry Park Primary School
 Methodist Girls' School (Primary)
 Nanyang Primary School
 Pei Hwa Presbyterian Primary School
 Raffles Girls' Primary School

Secondary schools 
Anglo Chinese School*
St Joseph's Institution
Singapore Chinese Girls School*
 Hwa Chong Institution
 Methodist Girls' School (Secondary)
 Nanyang Girls' High School
 National Junior College
 St. Margaret's Secondary School

Tertiary Institutions 
 Hwa Chong Institution 
 National Junior College
 St Joseph's Institution
 Ngee Ann Polytechnic
 Singapore University of Social Sciences

Other schools 
 Chatsworth International School
 DIMENSIONS International College (Bukit Timah Campus)
 German European School
 Hollandse School
 Hwa Chong International School
 St Francis Methodist School
 Singapore Korean International School
 Swiss School in Singapore

See also 
 Bukit Timah Monkey Man – cryptid said to be living in the Bukit Timah forest

References

Sources
National Heritage Board (2002), Singapore's 100 Historic Places, Archipelago Press,

External links

 
Central Region, Singapore
Places in Singapore